Issus or Issos (Phoenician: Sissu,  or Ἰσσοί) is an ancient settlement on the strategic coastal plain straddling the small Pinarus river (a fast melt-water stream several metres wide) below the navigationally difficult inland mountains towering above to the east in the Turkish Province of Hatay, near the border with Syria. It can be identified with Kinet Höyük in the village of Yeṣilköy near Dörtyol in the Hatay province of Turkey. Excavations on the mound occurred between 1992 and 2012 by Bilkent University. It is most notable for being the place of no fewer than three decisive ancient or medieval battles each called in their own era the Battle of Issus:

 The Battle of Issus (333 BC); Alexander the Great of Macedonia defeated Darius III of Persia. This battle is occasionally called the First Battle of Issus, but is more generally known simply as the Battle of Issus, owing to the importance of Alexander's victory over the First Persian Empire and its impact on subsequent history of the region, including all the successor polities.
 Battle of Issus (194), or Second Battle of Issus — between the forces of Emperor Septimius Severus and his rival, Pescennius Niger.
Battle of Issus (622), or Third Battle of Issus — between the Byzantine Empire  and the Sassanid Persian Empire.

Whether Issus is still present within a modern settlement is hotly debated among researchers. Regardless of which mountain brook was the locus of the battles, the old town was situated close to present-day İskenderun, Turkey, in the Gulf of İskenderun. Today, no town exists on both sides of the Pinarus river, which may or may not have been called Issus.

Although Issus was once considered to have been an episcopal see, there is no evidence to support that idea: Issus is not mentioned in the "Notitiae Episcopatuum" of the Patriarchate of Antioch, to which the Roman province of Cilicia belonged.

References 

Archaeological sites of ancient Anatolia
Ancient Greek archaeological sites in Turkey
Populated places of the Byzantine Empire
History of Turkey
Achaemenid cities
Former populated places in Cilicia
History of Hatay Province
Populated places in ancient Cilicia